The 1986 Tour de France was the 73rd edition of Tour de France, one of cycling's Grand Tours. The Tour began in Boulogne-Billancourt on 4 July and finished on the Champs-Élysées in Paris on 23 July.

In June, 23 teams had requested to start in the 1986 Tour. The Tour direction accepted 21 applications, so a total of 21 teams participated in the 1986 Tour de France. The two teams whose application was denied were Skala-Skil and Miko. Each team sent a squad of ten riders, which meant that the race would start with a peloton of 210 cyclists, a record setting total. From the 210 riders that began this edition, 132 made it to the finish in Paris.

 became the Tour's first team from the United States, with a squad consisting of eight Americans, one Canadian and one Mexican. Jim Ochowicz, 's founder and manager, met with the Amaury Sport Organisation (ASO) and persuaded them to invite his team. In the Spring, the team withdrew from competition in Europe (missing the opportunity to become the first American team in the history of the Vuelta a España) due to the United States conflict with Libya, losing out on much needed competitive racing unavailable in the United States.

Teams

Cyclists

By starting number

By team

By nationality
The 210 riders that competed in the 1986 Tour de France were represented by 20 different countries.

Notes

References

1986 Tour de France
1986